The men's decathlon at the 2021 World Athletics U20 Championships was held at the Kasarani Stadium on 20 and 21 August.

Records

Results

References

heptathlon
Combined events at the World Athletics U20 Championships